Leen Ryckaert (born 8 November 1957, in Ghent) is a Flemish psychologist and writer.

Biography

Ryckaert studied psychology and educational sciences at the Ghent University. She was scientific assistant at the University of Ghent and psycho-pedagogic consultant at a PMS-centre (now CLB – Centre for Student Coaching). She is now semi-retired as clinical psychologist.

In March 2011, the book Je bent niet jouw gedachten was published. It is a guide for people suffering from occupational burnout and depression (mood) and offers a way to choose for happiness.

In January 2023, the Italian translation of this book Non sei i tuoi pensieri was published by  

Ryckaert is the author of the book Omgaan met Ouders, a handbook for teachers to help them deal in their meetings with parents.

In 1985, Ryckaert published the paper "Kohlberg's cognitive moral development theory. Application to juvenile delinquency" and in 1987 the paper "The control of anger and aggressive behaviour. The role of cognitive factors"

Works

Non-fiction 
 Omgaan met ouders (2005/2006)  (Third, fully revised edition 2015) 
 Je bent niet jouw gedachten (2011)  (Third, fully revised edition 2020) 
 Non sei i tuoi pensieri (2023)

References

1957 births
Belgian psychologists
Belgian women psychologists
Belgian non-fiction writers
Living people
Writers from Ghent
Ghent University alumni